Pengiran Abdul Aziz  Pengiran Abu Bakar (born 23 September 1945) is a nobleman and formerly a police officer from Brunei who previously served as the Controller of the Royal Customs and Excise of Brunei, member of the Royal Succession Council, member of the Royal Council, and the head of the Royal Customs and Protocols Department (Jabatan Adat Istiadat Negara). He was one of the concept contributors for the change in the name of the Police Force to the Royal Brunei Police Force (RBPF) as a Royal Dignitary, a State Dignitary, and a Member of Councils. Notably, he also made changes to the flag, the pattern, and the uniform color of the department's officers and staffs during his tenure as the Controller of the Royal Customs and Excise.

Early life and education 
Abdul Aziz was born on 23 September 1945, in Kampong Kianggeh, Brunei Town, to Pengiran Haji Abu Bakar bin Pengiran Omar. He began his elementary education at Pekan Brunei Malay School in 1954, followed by Jamalul Alam Malay School, Ahmad Tajuddin Malay School (1956–1958), St. Michael's School (1958–1959), and Anthony Abell College (1959-1966).

Career 
Enlisting as a police officer (Inspector) on 1 January 1967, and serving until 28 November 1971. He was appointed as the Deputy Controller of the Royal Customs and Excise of Brunei on 29 November 1971, and served in that capacity until 1975. From 1975 to 31 March 2000, he served as the Royal Controller of Customs and Excise of Brunei. From 20 August 1986 to 1 April 2000, he was appointed Grand Chamberlain, and later be promoted to Chief of Jabatan Adat Istiadat Negara by Sultan Hassanal Bolkiah on 1 April 2000. On 8 April 2021, he would be succeeded by Idris Abdul Kahar.

Personal life

Marriage 
Abdul Aziz would marry Princess Masna Bolkiah, the first ceremony, Istiadat Berjarum-jarum was held at Istana Darul Hana on 16 October 1969. Followed by several other ceremonies for the rest of the month such as; Istiadat Membuka Gendang Jaga-jaga on the 23rd, Istiadat Menghantar Pertunangan on the 24th, Istidata Berbedak on the 30th and Istiadat Akad Nikah on the 31st. The ceremony would carry on well into the following month with Istiadat Berinai on the 5th, Istiadat Bersanding on the 6th, Istiadat Muleh Tiga Hari on the 9th, Istiadat Pengantin Lelaki on the 10th and lastly the Istiadat Menutup Gendang Jaga-jaga on that same day.

Issue 
Together they have a total of 5 children:

 Pengiran Anak Haji Abdul Wadood Bolkiah
 Pengiran Anak Haji Mohammed Al-Mokhtar
 Pengiran Anak Haji Abdul 'Ali Yil-Kabier
 Pengiran Anak Hajah Ameenah Bushral Bulqiah
 Pengiran Anak Haji Abdul Quddus

Hobbies 
He spends his free time playing sports and working in the welfare system.

Honours

National honours 

Abdul Aziz was bestowed the title of Yang Amat Mulia Pengiran Lela Cheteria Sahibun Najabah, and earned the following honours;

  Family Order of Laila Utama (DK) – Dato Seri Utama (15 July 1972)
  Sultan Hassanal Bolkiah Medal (PHBS)
  Armed Forces Service Medal (PBLI)
  Meritorious Service Medal (PJK)
  Long Service Medal (PKL)
  Proclamation of Independence of Brunei Medal – 10 March 1997
  Coronation Medal – 1 August 1968
  Golden Jubilee Medal – (5 October 2017)
  Silver Jubilee Medal – (5 October 1992)

Foreign honours 
: Knight Grand Cross (First Class) of the Most Exalted Order of the White Elephant

References 

1945 births
Bruneian Muslims
Bruneian police officers
Living people